Arisaema section Tortuosa is a section of the genus Arisaema.

Description
Plants in this section have underground tubers with 3-foliolate leaves.

Distribution
Plants from this section are found from China, Nepal, Bhutan, and Myanmar to India and Sri Lanka.

Species
Arisaema section Tortuosa comprises the following species:

References

Plant sections